La Sepultura is a biosphere reserve in southern Mexico. It  protects a portion of the Sierra Madre de Chiapas range in the state of Chiapas.

Geography
La Sepultura Biosphere Reserve covers the western end of the Sierra Madre de Chiapas. The Zona de Protección Forestal en los terrenos que se encuentran en los municipios de La Concordia, Angel Albino Corzo, Villa Flores y Jiquipilas, a natural resources protection area, lies east of la Sepultura, covering the northern slopes of the Sierra.

The northern slopes of the Sierra descend to the Chiapas Depression, which is drained by the Grijalva River and its tributaries, including the La Venta River, which eventually empty into the Gulf of Mexico. The southern slopes are drained by numerous smaller rivers and streams which descend to the narrow coastal plain and empty into the Pacific Ocean.

Flora and fauna
La Sepultura Biosphere Reserve is home to a range of ecosystems, which vary with elevation, exposure, and soils. These include lowland deciduous forest or tropical dry forest, mid-elevation evergreen tropical forest, including areas of humid cloud forest, and montane pine–oak forests, which include pine–oak, pine–oak–liquidambar, and pine savanna. Native trees include Ulmus mexicana, Manilkara zapota, Triplaris melaenodendron, Cedrela odorata, Liquidambar styraciflua, Haematoxylum brasiletto, and Croton guatemalensis.

The ecoregion is home to five species of cats, including jaguar (Panthera onca), puma (Puma concolor), jaguarundi (Herpailurus yagouaroundi), ocelot (Leopardus pardalis), and oncilla (Leopardus tigrinus). Other mammals include spider monkey, Baird's tapir (Tapirus bairdii), brocket deer (Mazama sp.), and northern tamandua anteater (Tamandua mexicana). Resident birds include the white-fronted parrot (Amazona albifrons) and yellow-naped parrot (Amazona auropalliata), and the raptors gray hawk (Buteo plagiatus), Swainson's hawk (Buteo swainsoni), solitary eagle (Buteogallus solitarius), king vulture (Sarcoramphus papa), and peregrine falcon (Falco peregrinus). 90 species of migratory birds visit the reserve.

Conservation
In 1995 the Mexican government designated a portion of La Sepultura as a strict nature reserve, covering an area of 18.12 km2, and an area of 112.14 km2 was designated for ecological conservation.

The biosphere reserve was designated by UNESCO in 2006. It covers 1673.1 km2, which includes the strict nature reserve (known as the core zone or zona nucleo), the ecological conservation area, and a portion of the Zona de Protección Forestal.

Portions of the reserve are inhabited, often with traditional forms of land ownership and management. Local economic activities include animal husbandry, agriculture (maize, beans, and other crops), coffee growing, and timber harvesting. Local people also harvest forest products like pine resin and xate palm leaves (Chamaedorea spp.).

References

Biosphere reserves of Mexico
Protected areas of Chiapas
Sierra Madre de Chiapas
Important Bird Areas of Mexico
Central American pine–oak forests
Southern Pacific dry forests